Diamond Ranch may refer to:
Diamond Ranch (Chugwater, Wyoming), listed on the National Register of Historic Places listings in Platte County, Wyoming
Diamond Ranch High School
Diamond Ranch Academy

See also
Diamond A Ranch (disambiguation)